Christopher Anthony Cloete (born 15 February 1991) is a South African rugby union player, currently playing for Bath in the Gallagher Premiership. His regular position is flanker.

Early life
Cloete grew up in East London and was included in a number of youth provincial sides; he represented them at the 2004 Under-13 Craven Week, the 2006 Under-16 Grant Khomo Week and at the Under-18 Craven Week competitions in both 2008 and 2009.

He was also included in the 2009 South African Schools side. He came on as a replacement in their 86–3 victory against Italy and started their 13–45 defeat to England in two matches played in August 2009.

Career

Sharks

After high school, Cloete moved to Durban to join the Sharks Academy.

He returned to action for the s in 2011, scoring three tries in fourteen appearances in the 2011 Under-21 Provincial Championship.

In 2012, he was included in the  Vodacom Cup squad for the first time and he made his first class debut in his hometown of East London, coming on as a replacement in a 42–0 victory against former side . He made one more start and three appearances off the bench in the remainder of the competition and started a six matches for the s in the 2012 Under-21 Provincial Championship in the second half of 2012.

Western Province

In 2013, Cloete moved to Cape Town to join . He made his debut for Western Province in the 2013 Vodacom Cup competition, starting their match against Western Cape rivals  and scoring a try in a 17–17 draw between the sides in Ceres.

Varsity Cup

In 2014, Cloete joined Port Elizabeth-based university side . He played in all eight of their matches during the 2014 Varsity Cup, which saw the Madibaz reach their second consecutive semi-final in the competition. Cloete was the top try scorer in the competition, scoring eight tries in his eight appearances. This included five tries in their opening match of the campaign, a 45–29 victory over three-times champions, .

Kandy

After the 2014 Varsity Cup competition, Cloete moved to Sri Lanka to join Dialog Rugby League and Clifford Cup side Kandy. He helped the side win the competition, beating Navy in a two-legged final. Cloete was the top try scorer in the league (and also scored a try in the final), but sustained an injury prior to their 2015 Clifford Cup and returned to South Africa to have an operation.

Return to Western Province

Upon his return to South Africa, Cloete joined Hamilton rugby club. He was included in  squad for the 2015 Currie Cup Premier Division and named on the bench for their opening match of the season against .

Pumas, Southern Kings & South Africa A

On 23 June 2017, Cloete started for South Africa 'A' in their second test against the French Barbarians, scoring two tries in his sides 48–28 win in Orlando Stadium, Soweto.

Munster

In July 2017, it was announced that Cloete had joined Irish United Rugby Championship side Munster on a three-year contract. He made his debut for the province on 3 November 2017, starting against Welsh side Dragons in a 2017–18 Pro14 fixture and helping Munster to a 49–6 win. Cloete earned the Man-of-the-Match award in Munster's 36–19 away win against Zebre on 26 November 2017. He scored his first try for Munster in their 36–10 win against Ospreys on 2 December 2017. Cloete made his European Rugby Champions Cup debut on 9 December 2017, starting in the Pool 4 fixture against Leicester Tigers in Thomond Park and scoring a try in the provinces' 33–10 win.

He suffered a fractured forearm during Munster's 21–10 win against Glasgow Warriors on 23 February 2018. Having returned to training after rehabilitating the forearm injury, Cloete then suffered a groin injury which caused him to miss Munster's 2018–19 pre-season fixtures and the opening two rounds of the 2018–19 Pro14. Cloete made his return from injury on 14 September 2018, starting in Munster's Pro14 round 3 fixture against Ospreys and earning the Man-of-the-Match award in Munster's 49–13 win. He extended his contract with Munster by an additional two years in October 2018. After five seasons with province, Cloete left Munster at the end of the 2021–22 season.

Bath

Cloete joined English Premiership Rugby club Bath ahead of the 2022–23 season, where former Munster head coach Johann van Graan also moved as the clubs new head coach.

Personal

He is the younger brother of prop Wesley Cloete.

References

External links
Munster Profile
URC Profile

Living people
1991 births
Rugby union players from East London, Eastern Cape
South African rugby union players
Sharks (Currie Cup) players
Western Province (rugby union) players
Southern Kings players
Pumas (Currie Cup) players
Munster Rugby players
Bath Rugby players
South African expatriate rugby union players
Expatriate rugby union players in England
South African expatriate sportspeople in England
Rugby union flankers